Juma Muwowo (born 19 January 1980) is a Zambian male badminton player. Muwowo also play for the Central Sport Club in Zambia. In 2010, he competed at the Commonwealth Games in New Delhi, India. In 2015, he reach the final at the Zambia International tournament in the mixed doubles event with Ogar Siamupangila after beat their compatriot Chongo Mulenga and Mary Chilambe in the straight game, but they were defeated by A. Kashkal and Hadia Hosny of Egypt in the final. In 2016, the pair also reach the final in the same tournament and finished as runner-up.

Achievements

BWF International Challenge/Series (3 runners-up)
Mixed Doubles

 BWF International Challenge tournament
 BWF International Series tournament
 BWF Future Series tournament

References

External links
 
 

1997 births
Living people
People from Kitwe
Zambian male badminton players
Badminton players at the 2010 Commonwealth Games
Commonwealth Games competitors for Zambia
Competitors at the 2007 All-Africa Games
Competitors at the 2011 All-Africa Games
African Games competitors for Zambia